People v. Rizzo, Court of Appeals of New York, 246 N.Y. 334, 158 N.E. 888 (1927), is a criminal case that set precedent for what constitutes an attempt to commit a crime.

Facts 
Charles Rizzo, Anthony J. Dorio, Thomas Milo and John Thomasell planned to rob a courier carrying payroll. Rizzo told the others that he could identify the courier. They drove around looking for the courier but they failed to locate the courier before police stopped and arrested them.

Prior History 
Charles Rizzo was convicted of attempted robbery in the first degree by the Bronx County Court on February 17, 1927. He appealed to the Supreme Court of New York, Appellate Division which affirmed the conviction on June 27, 1927.

Conclusion 
Actions must be dangerously close to the commission of a crime to satisfy the action for an attempt. Having failed to find his target, Rizzo could not have completed a substantial step toward commission of robbery to be found guilty of attempting robbery.

References

External links

1927 in United States case law
U.S. state criminal case law